Tore is a Scandinavian masculine name. It is derived from the Old Norse name Thórir, which is composed of thorr which means thunder, and arr which means warrior. So Thunder Warrior or Thor's Warrior. The most famous person by this name is probably Tore Hund, who killed Olaf II of Norway at the Battle of Stiklestad.
Approximately 18,000 people in Norway are named Tore.

People named Tore include:
Tore Austad (born 1935), Norwegian politician and former Minister of Education and Church Affairs
Tore Berger (born 1944), Norwegian sprint canoer
Tore Blom (1880-1961), Swedish track and field athlete and Olympian
Tore Brovold (born 1970), Norwegian skeet shooter
Tore Brunborg (born 1960), Norwegian jazz musician, saxophonist and composer
Tore Cervin (born 1950), Swedish footballer
Tore André Dahlum (born 1968), Norwegian former footballer
Tore Edman (1904-1995), Swedish ski jumper
Tore Ellingsen (born 1962), Norwegian economist
Tore Eriksen (born 1947), Norwegian economist, diplomat and civil servant
Tore Linné Eriksen (born 1945), Norwegian historian
Tore Eriksson (born 1937), Swedish biathlete and Olympic medalist
Tore André Flo (born 1973), Norwegian football striker
Tore Forslund (1927-2000), Swedish writer, poet, Lutheran priest, street musician and magazine editor
Tore Foss (1901–1968), Norwegian singer, actor and theatre director
Tore Gjelsvik (1916–2006), Norwegian geologist and polar explorer, and resistance fighter in World War II
Tore Gullen (born 1949), Norwegian cross-country skier and Olympic athlete
Tore Andreas Gundersen (born 1986), Norwegian footballer
Tore Gustafsson (born 1962), Swedish hammer thrower and Olympic athlete
Tore Hagebakken (born 1961), Norwegian politician
Tore Hamsun (1912-1995), Norwegian painter, writer, publisher. Son of Knut Hamsun.
Tore Haugen (born 1931), Norwegian politician
Tore Hedin (1927-1952), Swedish mass murderer
Tore Hem (born 1944), Norwegian sport wrestler and Olympic competitor
Tore Viken Holvik (born 1988), Norwegian snowboarder
Tore Ruud Hofstad (born 1979), Norwegian cross-country skier and Olympic athlete
Tore Holm (1896-1977), Swedish sailor in numerous Olympic Games
Tore Janson (born 1936), Swedish linguist and professor
Tore Johansson, Swedish record producer, composer and musician
Tore Johnsen (born 1969), Norwegian clergyman and leader of the Sami Church Council
Tore Kallstad (born 1965), Norwegian footballer
Tore Keller (1905-1988), Swedish football striker and Olympic athlete
Tore Killingland (born 1953), Norwegian business manager, environmentalist and politician
Tore Klevstuen (born 1966), Norwegian speed skater and Olympic athlete
Tore Krogstad (born 1967), Norwegian football goalkeeper
Tore Lennartsson (born 1952), Swedish footballer
Tore Vagn Lid (born 1973), Norwegian theatre director, playwright and musician
Tore A. Liltved (1939-2004), Norwegian politician
Tore Lindbekk (born 1933), Norwegian sociologist and politician
Tore Lindholt (born 1941), Norwegian economist, civil servant and politician
Tore Lindzén (1914–2003), Swedish water polo player and Olympic athlete
Tore Ljungqvist (1905–1980), Swedish water polo player and Olympic athlete
Tore Lokoloko (born 1930), former Governor-General of Papua New Guinea
Tore Meinecke (born 1967), German tennis player
Tore Falch Nilsen (1948–2008), Norwegian ice hockey player and Olympic athlete
Tore Nordenstam (born 1934), Swedish philosopher
Tore Nordseth (born 1966), Norwegian politician
Tore Nordtun (born 1949), Norwegian politician
Tore Nordtvedt (born 1944), Norwegian footballer
Tore Ørjasæter (1886-1968), Norwegian poet
Tore Østby (born 1972), songwriter, producer and guitarist
Tore Pedersen (born 1969), Norwegian retired football defender
Tore Pryser (born 1945), Norwegian historian and professor
Tore Bernt Ramton (1945–2010), Norwegian sports official
Tore Reginiussen (born 1986), Norwegian footballer
Tore Renberg (born 1972), Norwegian writer
Tore Olaf Rimmereid (born 1962), Norwegian businessman
Tore Sagvolden (born 1959), Norwegian orienteering competitor
Tore Sandvik (born 1972), Norwegian orienteering competitor and World champion
Tore Schei (born 1946), Chief Justice of the Supreme Court of Norway
Tore Schweder (born 1943), Norwegian statistician and professor
Tore Segelcke (1901-1979), Norwegian actress
Tore Strømøy (born 1960), Norwegian journalist, television presenter, talk show host and former racewalker
Tore Svennberg (1858–1941), Swedish stage and film actor and theatre director
Tore Tønne (1948-2002), former Norwegian Minister of Health and Social Affairs
Tore Torgersen (born 1968), Norwegian ten-pin bowler
Tore Torvbråten (born 1968), Norwegian curler and Olympic medalist
Tore Tvedt (born 1943), Norwegian founder of the far-right organization Vigrid
Tore Uppström (1937-2006), Swedish pianist, composer and author
Tore Vikingstad (born 1975), Norwegian professional ice hockey player
Tore Zetterholm (1915–2001), Swedish novelist, playwright and journalist

References 

Scandinavian masculine given names
Norwegian masculine given names
Swedish masculine given names